The All-Ireland Intermediate Club Football Championship is an annual gaelic football competition which began in 2003. The winners of the Intermediate Club Championship from each county enter the competition.

Finals by year

Winners by County

See also
 Munster Intermediate Club Football Championship
 Leinster Intermediate Club Football Championship
 Connacht Intermediate Club Football Championship
 Ulster Intermediate Club Football Championship

References

External links
 2009 Final
 2011 Final report

 
Intermediate